Gimmick is an 2019 Indian Kannada-language comedy horror film, directed by Naganna and  produced by Deepak Samidurai under the banner of Samy Pictures. The film starring Ganesh, Ronica Singh, Chi. Guru Dutt, Shobaraj, Ravishankar Gowda and Sundar Raj is a remake of 2016 Tamil film Dhilluku Dhuddu. The film marks Ronica Singh's debut in the Kannada film industry. The film was released theatrically on 15 August 2019.

The story of the film follows a happy-go-lucky poor guy Gani
(Played by Ganesh) and wrestler Raani
(played by Ronica Singh), daughter of a rich father, who tries to separate them.

Cast 
 Ganesh as Gani
 Ronica Singh as Raani
 Chi. Guru Dutt as Shet father of Raani
 Ravishankar Gowda as Pratao
 Shobaraj
 Mandya Ramesh as Manic
 Sundar Raj as Pulti Sundar raj
 Vijay Chendoor

Production 
Naganna, the director of the film began the horror comedy with Ganesh, which was filmed at a house in Sri Lanka,  Mysuru and Bengaluru. Gimmick cast included Ravi Shankar Gowda, Sadhu Kokila, Shobhraj and Sundar Raj in supporting roles. The film was bankrolled by Deepak Sami under his banner Sami Pictures. The film marked Ronica Singh's debut in the Kannada film industry. The filming was wrapped in January.

Soundtrack 

The soundtrack of the film is composed by Arjun Janya and lyrics by Kaviraj.

Marketing and release 
The official trailer of the film was unveiled on 18 May 2019. The official sneak-peak of the film was unveiled on 25 May 2019.

The film was theatrically released on 15 August 2019.

Reception

Critical response
A Sharadhaa of The New Indian Express opined that music director Ajrun Janya's compositions suited the mood of the film. Praising the cinematography by Vignesh Vasu, Sharadhaa concluded, "In company of ghosts, the horror film with comical twists makes for a one-time-watch." Vinay Lokesh of The Times of India gave three stars out of five and noted that the story took time to come up, but after that there were 'edge-of-the-seat moments' till the end. Lokesh concluded, "The actor excels in his role in this horror-comedy. If you have not watched the original, Gimmick is sure to entertain.

References

External links 
 Gimmick on IMDb

2019 films
Kannada remakes of Tamil films
Indian comedy horror films
2010s Kannada-language films
Films shot in Bangalore
Films shot in Mysore
Films shot in Sri Lanka
Films directed by Naganna